Connecticut gained two seats in reapportionment following the 1790 census.

Three special elections followed the 1792 elections in Connecticut after Representatives-elect Sturges and Huntington resigned before the start of Congress and Mitchell was elected to the Senate.

See also 
 United States House of Representatives elections, 1792 and 1793
 List of United States representatives from Connecticut

References 

1792
United States House of Representatives
Connecticut